Grekov or реков may refer to:

Nikolay Grekov (1807–1866), Russian poet esteemed by many composers
Dimitar Grekov (1847–1901), Bulgarian politician
Boris Grekov (1882–1953), Soviet historian
Mitrofan Grekov (1882–1934), Soviet painter
Valentyn Grekov (1976–), Ukrainian judoka